The Eucharist in the Lutheran Church (also called the Mass, the Sacrament of the Altar, the Lord's Supper, the Lord's Table, Holy Communion, the Breaking of the Bread, and the Blessed Sacrament) refers to the liturgical commemoration of the Last Supper. Lutherans believe in the real presence of Christ in the Eucharist, affirming the doctrine of sacramental union, "in which the body and blood of Christ are truly and substantially (vere et substantialiter) present, offered, and received with the bread and wine."

Beliefs

Lutherans believe that the Body and Blood of Christ are "truly and substantially present in, with and under the forms" of consecrated bread and wine (the elements), so that communicants eat and drink both the elements and the true Body and Blood of Christ himself in the Sacrament of the Eucharist whether they are believers or unbelievers. The Lutheran doctrine of the Real Presence is also known as the sacramental union. This theology was first formally and publicly confessed in the Wittenberg Concord (1536). It has been called "consubstantiation," but Lutheran theologians reject the use of this term "since Lutherans do not believe either in that local conjunction of two bodies, nor in any commingling of bread and of Christ's body, of wine and of his blood." Lutherans use the term "in, with, and under the forms of consecrated bread and wine" and "sacramental union" to distinguish their understanding of the Eucharist from those of the Reformed and other traditions.

Use of the sacrament
For Lutherans the Eucharist is not considered to be a valid sacrament unless the elements are used according to Christ's mandate and institution (consecration, distribution, and reception). This was first formulated in the Wittenberg Concord of 1536 in the formula: Nihil habet rationem sacramenti extra usum a Christo institutum ("Nothing has the character of a sacrament apart from the use instituted by Christ"). To remove any hint of doubt or superstition, the reliquiæ traditionally are either consumed, poured into the earth, or reserved (see below). In most Lutheran congregations, the administration of private communion of the sick and "shut-in" (those too feeble to attend services) involves a completely separate service of the Eucharist for which the sacramental elements are consecrated by the celebrant.

Today, many Lutheran churches offer the Eucharist weekly, while others offer it less frequently. Weddings and funerals may sometimes include the celebration of the Eucharist, but at the ordinations of pastors/priests and the consecration of bishops, the Eucharist is nearly always celebrated.

Practices in American Lutheran churches
The Evangelical Lutheran Church in America (ELCA) and its congregations practice open communion—meaning that Holy Communion is offered to all those who are baptized. Congregations in the Lutheran Church–Missouri Synod (LCMS) and the Wisconsin Evangelical Lutheran Synod (WELS) practice closed communion (close is used by some in place of closed), meaning that Lutheran catechetical instruction is required for all people before receiving the Eucharist, though some congregations in these synods simply either ask that one speak to the pastor before the service to confirm their common faith or acknowledge this on their attendance card. For Lutherans in general, confession and absolution are considered proper preparation for receiving the sacrament. However, the historic practice among Lutherans of preparation by private confession and absolution is rarely found in American Lutheran congregations. For this reason, often a brief order or corporate rite of confession and absolution is included at the beginning of Lutheran liturgies.

A growing number of congregations in the ELCA, offer instruction to baptized children generally between the ages of 6–8 and, after a relatively short period of catechetical instruction, the children are admitted to partake of the Eucharist. Most other ELCA congregations offer First Communion instruction to children in the 5th or 6th grade (ages about 10-11). In other Lutheran churches, the person must have received confirmation before receiving the Eucharist. Infants and children who have not received the catechetical instruction (or confirmation) may be brought to the Eucharistic distribution by their parents to be blessed by the pastor.

Manner of reception

The manner of receiving the Eucharist differs throughout the world. In most American Lutheran churches, an older Latin Rite custom is maintained in which the communicants kneel on cushions at the altar rail. In other Lutheran churches, the process is much like the Post-Vatican II revised rite of the Roman Catholic Church. The eucharistic minister (most commonly the pastor) and the assistants line up, with the eucharistic minister in the center holding the hosts and the two assistants on either side holding the chalices. The people process to the front in lines and receive the Eucharist standing. Following this, the people make the sign of the cross (if they choose to) and return to their places in the congregation. Traditionally only those within the Office of the Holy Ministry distributed the Sacrament, but it has become common for lay people to assist in the distribution.

The host is commonly a thin unleavened wafer, but leavened wafers or bread may also be used. Traditionally, the minister placed the host on the tongue of the communicant, with the communicants not even touching the base of the chalice as they received the Blood of Christ. More recently, it has become common for the laity to receive the host in the hand. Some parishes use intinction, the dipping of the host into the chalice.

The wine is commonly administered in a chalice, but many congregations offer individual cups as well. These may be either prefilled or filled from a pouring chalice during the distribution of the Eucharist. Some ELCA congregations make grape juice available for children and those who are abstaining from alcohol and some will accommodate those with an allergy to wheat, gluten, or grapes.

Upon receiving the Body and Blood, it is common for communicants to make the sign of the cross.

Adoration and the Corpus Christi

Lutheran Eucharistic adoration is not commonly practiced, but when it occurs it is done only from the moment of consecration to reception. Many people kneel when they practice this adoration. The consecrated elements are treated with much respect and in many areas are reserved as in Eastern Orthodox, Roman Catholic, and Anglican practice. The Feast of the Corpus Christi was retained in the main calendar of the Lutheran Church up until about 1600, but continues to be celebrated by some Lutheran congregations. On this feast day the consecrated host is displayed on an altar in a monstrance and, in some churches, the rites of the Benediction of the Blessed Sacrament and other forms of adoration are celebrated.

Liturgy

The Lutheran worship liturgy is called the "Mass", "Divine Service", "Holy Communion", or "the Eucharist." An example formula for the Lutheran liturgy as found in the Lutheran Service Book of the LCMS is as follows:

The "Great Thanksgiving" or Sursum corda is chanted or spoken.

Next, the proper preface is chanted or spoken by the pastor. Below is an example:

This is followed by the Sanctus, which is sung by the congregation.

Next, the first part of the Eucharistic Prayer is spoken by the pastor.

The pastor then says the Words of Institution. The pastor may also elevate the elements as well as genuflect.

The Eucharistic Prayer continues, along with the Memorial Acclamation.

The Lord's Prayer

The "Peace" or "pax"

Following this, the Agnus Dei is chanted.

The Distribution is next (see above for different manners), it is followed by the nunc dimittis, which is chanted as follows:

The postcommunion is prayed by the pastor.

Finally the Benedicamus Domino and benediction are spoken or chanted by the pastor and congregation with the Sign of the Cross being made at the end.

Music 
Communion is often accompanied by music. Most Lutheran hymnals have a section of communion hymns or hymns appropriate for the celebration of the Lord's Supper. Some of these hymns, such as I Come, O Savior, to Thy Table, Thy Table I Approach, and Schmücke dich, o liebe Seele (an English language translation of which is Soul, Adorn Yourself with Gladness), follow a Eucharist theme throughout, whilst others such as Wide Open Stand the Gates are sung in preparation or during distribution of the sanctified elements. Chorale preludes on their themes are traditionally played during communion (sub communione).

See also

Eucharistic theology
Lutheran sacraments

References

External links
An Explanation of The Common Service (1908)

 
Martin Luther
Lutheran sacraments and rites